This is a list of notable Taiwanese Americans, including both original immigrants who obtained American citizenship and their American descendants.

To be included in this list, the person must have a Wikipedia article showing they are Taiwanese American or must have references showing they are Taiwanese American and are notable.

List

Art and design 
 Malan Breton, fashion designer
 Wenlan Chia, fashion designer
 Doug Chiang, movie designer and artist
 Han Hsiang-ning, artist
 James Jean, artist
 Jen Kao, fashion designer
 Yu Tsai, photographer and America's Next Top Model creative consultant
 Alexander Wang, fashion designer
 Jason Wu, fashion designer 
 Luly Yang, fashion designer

Business 
 Fred Chang, founder of Newegg
 Morris Chang, founder of Taiwan Semiconductor Manufacturing Company
 Sam Chang, New York hotel developer
 Wayne Chang, founder of Crashlytics, entrepreneur, angel investor, film producer, and philanthropist
 Albert Chao, CEO and co-founder of Westlake Chemical
 Allen Chao, founder of Watson Pharmaceuticals
 Eva Chen, co-founder and CEO of Trend Micro
 Pehong Chen, founder of Gain Technology and Broadvision
 Steve Chen, founder and CEO of Galactic Computing
 Steve Chen, co-founder of YouTube
 Chen Wen-Chi, billionaire president and CEO of VIA Technologies, husband to HTC co-founder Cher Wang
 Albert Cheng, Interim President of Amazon Studios
 Andrew Cherng, founder of Chinese fast food restaurant chain Panda Express
 Ben Chiu, founder of KillerApp.com acquired by CNET
 Yu-kai Chou, gamification expert, entrepreneur and developer of Octalysis
 David Chu,  co-founder of Nautica, clothing company
 James Chu, founder, CEO and chairman of ViewSonic
 John Chuang, co-founder and CEO of Aquent
 Victor Ho, co-founder and CEO of FiveStars
 Tony Hsieh, CEO of Zappos.com, online shoe store
 Jameson Hsu, co-founder and CEO of Mochi Media
 Jensen Huang, CEO and co-founder of Nvidia
 Robert T. Huang, founder of SYNNEX
 Min H. Kao, co-founder of Garmin, billionaire
 Kai-Fu Lee,  President of Google China
 Alfred Lin, venture capitalist at Sequoia Capital
 Dan Lin, Hollywood film producer and former Senior Vice President at Warner Bros. Pictures
 Ivan Linn, CEO and founder of Folks
 Teresa H. Meng, co-founder of Qualcomm Atheros
 Ellen Pao,  lawyer and former chief executive officer of Reddit.
 Danny Pang, private equity manager, accused of running a Ponzi scheme
 Will Shu, co-founder and CEO of Deliveroo
 Lisa Su, CEO and president of Advanced Micro Devices
 David Sun, co-founder of Kingston Technologies, billionaire
 Janie Tsao, co-founder of Linksys
 Victor Tsao, co-founder of Linksys
 Greg Tseng, co-founder and CEO of Tagged
 John Tu, Taiwanese American co-founder of Kingston Technologies, billionaire
 Tien Tzuo, co-founder and CEO of Zuora
 William Wang, co-founder and CEO of Vizio
 Jerry Yang, co-founder of Yahoo!, billionaire
 Bing Yeh, founder of Silicon Storage Technology and Greenliant Systems

Entertainment 
 Lilan Bowden – actress
 Christina Chang – actress
 Louis Ozawa Changchien – actor; 1/2 Taiwanese
 Arvin Chen – film director and screenwriter
 Ian Chen – actor
 Lynn Chen – actress
 Jay Chern – film director and screenwriter
 Rosalie Chiang - actress, writer
 Tim Chiou – actor
 Jon M. Chu – film director
 Roger Fan – actor
 Ted Fu – founding member of Wong Fu Productions
 Peter Ho – actor
 Janet Hsieh – model and television personality
 Stephanie Hsu – actress
 George Hu – actor
 Eddie Huang – chef, television producer and presenter
 Tina Huang – actress
 Elaine Kao – actress
 Christine Ko – actress
 Michelle Krusiec – actress
 Katrina Law – actress; 1/2 Taiwanese
 Ang Lee – film director
 Georgia Lee – film director and screenwriter
 Erin Li – film director and screenwriter
 James Hiroyuki Liao – actor
 Annie Lin – musician and attorney
 Dan Lin – film and TV producer
 Justin Lin – film director
 Kelly Lin – actress and model
 Stephanie Lin – television journalist and beauty queen 
 Dyana Liu – actress
 Lucy Liu – actress
 Andy On – actor
 Bertha Bay-Sa Pan – film director, screenwriter and producer
 Will Pan – singer-songwriter
 Ivan Shaw – actor
 Fang-Yi Sheu – modern dancer
 Kobe Tai – former pornographic actress
 Timothy Tau – film director and screenwriter
 Will Tiao – actor and producer
 Albert Tsai – actor
 Jessika Van – actress and singer
 Garrett Wang – actor
 Wang Leehom – singer-songwriter and actor
 Anya Wu – actress and singer
 Constance Wu – actress
 Kevin Wu – YouTuber and actor
 Raymond Wu – professional poker player
 Vanness Wu – singer and actor
 Alan Yang – producer, screenwriter and director
 Hudson Yang – actor
 Jenny Yang – comedian
 Welly Yang – actor, writer and singer
 Kelvin Yu – actor and writer

Journalism 
 Emily Chang, journalist and anchor; host of Bloomberg TV's Bloomberg Technology
 Iris Chang, journalist, author of The Rape of Nanking and other books of Chinese history
 Jeff Chang, journalist, hip-hop historian
 Laura Chang, science editor, The New York Times
 Christine Chen, journalist and anchor
 Connie Chung, journalist and anchor; second woman ever to anchor a national news program
 Patty Hou, former news and fashion anchor, current entertainment anchor in Taiwan
 Laura Ling, journalist (mother was Taiwanese; sister of Lisa Ling)
 Lisa Ling, journalist (mother was Taiwanese; sister of Laura Ling)
 Henry Liu, aka Chiang Nan, writer and journalist
 Kristie Lu Stout, journalist and news anchor for CNN International
 Jeff Yang, journalist, author and father of actor Hudson Yang

Literature 
 Lan Samantha Chang, fiction writer; director of the Iowa Writer's Workshop
 Ted Chiang, fiction writer, author of Story of Your Life
 Jennifer Chow, novelist, fiction writer, author of The 228 Legacy
 Vanessa Hua, journalist, writer, author of Deceit and Other Possibilities 
 Eddie Huang, author of the memoirs Fresh Off the Boat: A Memoir (the basis for the TV show of the same name) and Double Cup Love: On the Trail of Family, Food, and Broken Hearts in China.
 Ed Lin, novelist, fiction writer, author of This Is A Bust
 Francie Lin, novelist, fiction writer, author of The Foreigner
 Grace Lin, children's book writer and illustrator
 Tao Lin, fiction writer
 Eric Liu, writer, speechwriter for Bill Clinton
 Henry Liu, aka Chiang Nan, writer and journalist
 Timothy Tau, fiction writer
 Shawna Yang Ryan, novelist, fiction writer, author of Green Island and Water Ghosts
 Esmé Weijun Wang, writer, author of The Collected Schizophrenias
 Julie Wu, novelist, fiction writer, author of The Third Son
 Charles Yu, novelist, fiction writer

Music 
 Jason Chen, singer
 Robert Chen, violinist, Concertmaster of Chicago Symphony Orchestra
 Andrew Chou, member of hip-hop group Machi based in Taiwan
 Peter Ho, singer
 Evonne Hsu, pop singer based in Taiwan
 Stanley Huang, singer based in Taiwan
 Miss Ko, singer-songwriter and rapper
 Gary Kuo, violinist and composer
 Chihchun Chi-sun Lee, composer
 Cho-Liang Lin, violinist
 Joseph Lin, first violinist for Juilliard String Quartet
 Richard Lin, violinist
 Amber Josephine Liu, singer and rapper from South Korean girl group f(x)
 Jerry Lo, singer-songwriter based in Taiwan
 Allen Ma, rapper from South Korean boy group Cravity
 Anthony Neely, singer
 Will Pan, pop singer based in Taiwan
 Fan-Wei Qi, pop singer based in Taiwan
 David Tao, singer-songwriter
 Vienna Teng, singer-songwriter
 Mark Tuan, rapper of South Korean boy group GOT7
 Lara Veronin, vocalist of Taiwanese group Nan Quan Ma Ma
 Dawen Wang, singer-songwriter
 Joanna Wang, singer-songwriter
 Leehom Wang, singer-songwriter based in Taiwan
 Vanness Wu, member of boyband F4 based in Taiwan
 Sophia Yan, pianist
 Cindy Yen, singer-songwriter
 Charlie Yin, producer-performer known as Giraffage

Politics, law and government 
 Ling Ling Chang, California State Senator
 Elaine Chao, United States Secretary of Labor in the George W. Bush Administration, Secretary of Transportation in the Donald Trump Administration, wife of Senate Minority Leader Mitch McConnell (R-KY)
 Angie Chen Button, Member of the United States House of Representatives (R-TX)
 Lanhee Chen, Policy Director and Chief Policy Adviser to the Romney-Ryan 2012 Presidential Campaign and Hoover Institution Fellow
 Lily Lee Chen, former mayor of Monterey Park, California
 Raymond Chen, United States Circuit Judge on the United States Court of Appeals for the Federal Circuit
 John Chiang, California State Controller in 2012
 David Chiu (Member of the California State Assembly)
 Mary Anne Franks, president of the Cyber Civil Rights Initiative and expert on the intersection of civil rights and technology
 James C. Ho, Judge of the United States Court of Appeals the Fifth Circuit Texas
 Ted Lieu, Member of the United States House of Representatives (D-CA)
 Goodwin Liu, Associate Justice of the Supreme Court of California
 John Liu, first Asian American City Councilman of New York City, and former New York City Comptroller
 Chris Lu, United States Deputy Secretary of Labor
 Grace Meng, U.S. Representative (D-NY)
 Jimmy Meng, U.S. Representative (D-NY) and father of Grace Meng
 Yuh-Line Niou, Member of the New York State Assembly from the 65th district
 Heidi Shyu, Under Secretary of Defense for Research and Engineering
 Katherine Tai, United States Trade Representative
 Katy Tang, San Francisco Supervisor, District 4
 Chiling Tong, president and CEO of The National Asian Pacific Islander American Chamber of Commerce & Entrepreneurship
 David Wu, first Taiwanese American U.S. Representative (D-OR)
 Michelle Wu, mayor of Boston
 Tim Wu, legal scholar, official in the Biden Administration tasked with Technology and Competition policy
 Andrew Yang, 2020 Presidential Candidate, founder and CEO of Venture for America, PAGE Ambassador, author, and former Attorney at Davis Polk & Wardwell in New York City
 Yiaway Yeh, mayor of Palo Alto, California
 Ellen Young, U.S. Representative (D-NY)

Science and education 
 Yuan Chang, co-discovered Kaposi's sarcoma-associated herpesvirus (KSHV) and Merkel cell polyomavirus
 Steve Chen, computer scientist, supercomputer designer, Cray
 Yet-Ming Chiang, materials scientist, professor at MIT, co-founder of American Superconductor, A123 Systems, Desktop Metal
 Hong-Yee Chiu, astrophysicist
 Paul C. W. Chu, physicist, superconductivity
 Steven Chu, 1997 Nobel Prize in Physics, first Asian-American to run one of the 16 national laboratories operated by the Department of Energy (Lawrence Berkeley National Laboratory), Secretary of Energy of the United States from 2009 to 2013
 Fan Chung, mathematician
 David Ho, AIDS researcher, 1996 Times Person of the Year
 Feng-hsiung Hsu, principal designer of the IBM Deep Blue chess machine
 Chenming Hu, developer of FinFET, National Medal of Technology and Innovation winner 
 C.-T. James Huang, linguist
 Henry C. Lee, forensic scientist
 Wen Ho Lee, nuclear physicist, wrongly accused for espionage and then acquitted
 Yuan Tseh Lee, Nobel Prize in Chemistry, Professor Emeritus University of California at Berkeley (He was Taiwanese American until 1994 when he renounced his American citizenship to become the President of Academia Sinica)
 Jen Sheen, biologist
 Chang-Lin Tien, former Chancellor of the University of California at Berkeley
 Samuel Ting, Nobel Prize in Physics in 1976 
 Sam Wang, neuroscientist and author
 Pei-Yuan Wei, creator of ViolaWWW
 Chi-Huey Wong, biochemist; 2014 Wolf Prize in Chemistry winner for his expertise in bioorganic and synthetic chemistry, especially in carbohydrate chemistry and chemical biology
 Alan Ming-ta Wu, molecular biologist and immunologist
 Henry T. Yang, chancellor, UC Santa Barbara
 Andrew Chi-Chih Yao, winner of the Turing Award; prominent computer scientist and computational theorist
 Horng-Tzer Yau, mathematician
 Nai-Chang Yeh, physicist specializing in condensed matter physics; Fellow, American Association for the Advancement of Science; Fellow, American Physical Society
 Soon Yu, international speaker, consultant, and adjunct professor at Parsons School of Design

Sports 
 Joy Burke, professional basketball player
 Corbin Carroll, professional baseball player
 Michael Chang, International Tennis Hall of Fame member;  youngest male tennis player to win a Grand Slam tournament
 Richard Chang, retired basketball player
 Karen Chen, figure skater, 2017 U.S. national champion.
 Stuart Fairchild, professional baseball player
 Tora Harris, high jumper; also of African-American descent
 Ariel Hsing, youngest U.S. table tennis national champion
 Jerry Hsu, professional skateboarder
 Jason Jung, tennis player on ATP Tour; also won the gold medal at the 2017 Summer Universiade .
 Vania King, tennis player on WTA Tour
 Candie Kung, golf player in the LPGA
 Alexander Massialas, foil fencer
 Janet Lee, tennis player on WTA Tour
 Jeremy Lin, first Taiwanese-American player in the NBA
 Joseph Lin, professional basketball player. Younger brother of Jeremy Lin
 Howard Shu, badminton player
 Kevin Tan, 2008 Olympic Games men's gymnastics bronze medalist
 Chien-Ming Wang, professional MLB pitcher, won 19 games with New York Yankees both in 2006 and 2007.
 Timothy Wang, table tennis player

Other 
 Richard Chen, celebrity chef
 André Chiang, celebrity chef of Michelin starred restaurants
 Hank Chien, world champion of Donkey Kong
 Arthur Chu, Jeopardy! contestant
 Tammy and Victor Jih, winners of the 14th season of The Amazing Race
 Crystal Lee, beauty queen; Miss California 2013; Miss America 2014 first runner-up; Miss Chinatown USA 2010; Miss California Outstanding Teen 2008
 Wayne Lo, American school shooter
 Ai-jen Poo, labor activist, president of the National Domestic Workers Alliance
 Jian Tan, Buddhist monk and current abbot of the Chung Tai Zen Center of Houston
 Nancy Wang Yuen, sociologist

References

Taiwanese

Americans
Taiwanese
Taiwanese